Darcy Stephen Ward (born 4 May 1992 in Nanango, Queensland) is a former motorcycle speedway rider from Australia, who won the 2009, 2010 and 2011 Australian Under-21 Championships as well as the 2009 and 2010 World Under-21 Championships. His career was ended by spinal injuries sustained in a crash in 2015.

Career history

Junior career
Darcy Ward started his speedway career as a junior in his native Queensland. He qualified for five Australian Under-16 Championships from 2003–2007, with a best finish of second in 2005 and again in 2007.

2009
In the 2009 season he rode for Unibax Toruń (Poland), King's Lynn Stars (Great Britain). and AC Landshut (Germany). Ward's first meeting in the Polish Ekstraliga was the Pomeranian-Kuyavian Derby between Toruń and Bydgoszcz at Polonia Stadium. In this match he scored seven points and one bonus (2,1*,0,1,3). Toruń won his meeting 51–39. Unibax Toruń won regular season and after play-off qualify to the Ekstraliga Final. In the final meetings, Ward scoring 11 points and his team lost to Falubaz Zielona Góta 80:88. In total, Ward scoring 63 points, 11 bonus points in 53 heats (10 meetings) and was qualify on 34th place (Average 1.396).

Ward won the 2009 World Under-21 Championship in Goričan, Croatia with 13 points. He also rode for Australia team at the Under-21 World Cup. In a Qualifying Round One he scored a maximum 15 points, but Australia finished third and were knocked out of the competition.

At home in Australia, Ward won the Australian Under-21 Championship in Gosford, the first of three straight Under-21 titles. He also finished ninth in his first run at the senior Australian Championship held over three rounds. Ward also won the Queensland Under-21 Championship in 2009.

With the King's Lynn Stars in Britain's Premier League, Ward won the League Championship, Knockout Cup and Premier Trophy.

2010
In 2010, Ward signed with Elite League team the Poole Pirates. Poole finished second in the 2010 Elite League.

At home he won his second straight Australian Under-21 title at Mildura's Olympic Park Speedway. Ward finished the meeting in third place on 11 points, but went on to win the 4-lap final. He then finished third in the three round Australian Championship behind Chris Holder and fellow Queenslander Troy Batchelor. Ward also won the New South Wales Championship at the Oakburn Park Speedway in Tamworth.

2011
In January 2011, Darcy became Australian Under-21 Champion for the third time at his home track, the North Brisbane Speedway, and thus emulating Chris Holder and Leigh Adams in claiming a straight hat-trick of titles. His 2011 win was a carbon copy of his 2010 win - third on 11 points before winning the Final. He then finished a career best second in the four round Australian Championship behind Holder and in front of Davey Watt.

In the 2011 season, starting in March, Ward rode for Poole Pirates (Great Britain), Lejonen (Sweden) and Gdańsk (Poland).

On Saturday, 27 August, Ward made his FIM Speedway Grand Prix debut as a Wildcard in Toruń, where he claimed 3rd place. Largely due to his impressive performance at Toruń, Ward was subsequently nominated as the Wildcard for the season's final Grand Prix at Gorzów Wielkopolski on Saturday, 8 October. Ward was classified as sixth in the Grand Prix after the meeting was abandoned due to bad weather and deteriorating track conditions after sixteen of the scheduled twenty-three races had been completed. Ward's successful appearances led to him being offered a permanent place in the 2012 Grand Prix series, however, Ward subsequently rejected the offer in favour of riding for Toruń in the Polish Ekstraliga. He also won the silver medal at the 2011 Speedway Under-21 World Championship.

2012
Ward missed a place in the 2012 Speedway Grand Prix series. He finished second with Poole in the Elite League. He also rode for Australia in the 2012 Speedway World Cup Final at the G&B Stadium in Målilla, Sweden where he scored 7 points to help the Aussies to a second-place finish behind Denmark.

2013–2014
Ward won his place in the 2013 Speedway Grand Prix as one of the 15 permanent riders. He won his first ever SGP when he took out the Grand Prix of Denmark at the Parken Stadium in Copenhagen, and two rounds later finished second in the Grand Prix of Latvia. Ward would eventually finish 8th with 106 points from the 12 round series, though he did not race in the Czech Republic, Great Britain and Poland.

As part of the Australian team, Ward finished third in the 2013 Speedway World Cup Final. He also rode for the Poole Pirates, winning the Elite League title.

Darcy Ward won the 2013 Golden Helmet of Pardubice, joining other Australian's Leigh Adams, Jason Crump and Ryan Sullivan as a winner of the Golden Helmet, the oldest speedway race in the world having been first run in 1929.

On 17 August 2014, Ward was excluded from the Latvian FIM Speedway Grand Prix in Daugavpils after failing an alcohol test. The FIM later provisionally suspended Ward (effective 28 August 2014) which saw him miss the 2015 Australian Championship.

Although Ward wanted to return to Polish club KS Apator Toruń after his suspension, he did not want to displace any current contracted riders.

2015
After returning from his FIM suspension, Ward was riding for Polish league team Zielona Góra on Sunday 23 August when he suffered a heavy crash in Heat 15 after catching Grudziadz rider Artem Laguta's back wheel. Ward was thrown awkwardly from his bike, landing on the back of his neck as he hit the safety fence. Reports confirmed that the crash left him with no lower body feeling. He was transported to hospital where he underwent spinal surgery.

Poole Pirates owner Matt Ford later reported that Ward had been moved to an undisclosed hospital in the UK where he has regained some movement of his arms. Ford also plans to stage a benefit meeting for Ward at Wimborne Road later in the year. In Australia, Gillman Speedway promoter Dave Parker also announced a tribute meeting for Ward to be held at the Adelaide speedway on 7 November with the gate proceeds going to Darcy Ward to help with his medical costs. The Gillman event was won by Ward's close friend Chris Holder (who also did 4 quick laps of the track as the passenger on Mark Plaisted's 1000cc sidecar).

In late 2015 Ward left the UK to continue his rehab at the Making Strides rehab centre in Burleigh Heads on the Gold Coast.

2021
In February 2021 Ward became a promoter and founded Darcy Ward Speedway Promotions in Australia. Ward now creates and promotes speedway meetings in Australia, where speedway continues to operate largely unaffected by the COVID-19 pandemic. In an interview on the Torque and Chatter Podcast, Ward confirmed he is working with other riders to expand his events internationally.

Darcy Ward Speedway Promotion events also raised money to help sick children all over Australia have access to vital medical equipment needed for their treatment.

Personal life
His father, George Ward, was also a speedway rider.

In May 2012, Ward was cleared of sexual assault in the UK after an incident on 17 August 2011.

On 20 October 2012, Ward was injured in an altercation outside the Churchill Arms, Sturminster Marshall, whilst out with a group of friends including his Poole Pirates team manager Neil Middleditch.  Ward suffered a head injury after hitting his head on the floor following a punch during the fight.  The injury caused Ward to miss the second leg of the British Elite League Play-off Final.  No charges were pressed.

On 13 February 2013 Ward appeared before Ipswich Magistrates Court, Queensland, to plead guilty to driving under the influence of liquor or a drug, failing to stop for the police, driving without a licence and driving an unregistered and uninsured vehicle. Ward pleaded guilty and was fined £3275.68 and was disqualified from driving for two years. Ward subsequently issued a public apology.

World Finals Appearances

Individual World Championship
 2011 - 16th - 22pts
 2013 - 8th - 106pts
 2014 - 14th - 75pts

World Cup
 2011 -  Gorzów Wielkopolski, Edward Jancarz Stadium - 2nd - 45pts (4)
 2012 -  Målilla, G&B Stadium - 2nd - 39pts (7)
 2013 -  Prague, Marketa Stadium - 3rd - 33pts (9)
 2014 -  Bydgoszcz, Polonia Bydgoszcz Stadium - 3rd - 36pts (10)

Individual U-21 World Championship
 2009 -  Goričan, Stadium Milenium - Winner - 13pts
 2010 - // - Winner - 35+3pts
 2011 - /// - 2nd - 46+3pts

Under-21 World Cup
 2012 -  Gniezno, Stadion Start Gniezno S.A. - 2nd - 44pts (14)
 2013 Team Speedway Junior World Championship -  Pardubice, Svítkova Stadion - 4th - 20pts (11)

Speedway Grand Prix results

Domestic competitions

Australia

Australian Championship
 2009 (3 rounds) - 9th - 34pts
 2010 (3 rounds) - 3rd - 51pts
 2011 (4 rounds) - 2nd - 63pts + 3pts - 1st at Olympic Park Speedway (Rd.4)

Australian Under-21 Championship
 2009 - Gosford Speedway - Winner - 14pts
 2010 - Olympic Park Speedway - Winner - 11pts (3rd) - 1st in Final
 2011 - North Brisbane Speedway - Winner - 11pts (3rd) - 1st in Final

Australian Under-16 Championship
 2003 - Bibra Lake Speedway - 13th - 5pts
 2004 - Olympic Park Speedway - 14th - 2pts
 2005 - Allen Park Speedway - 2nd - 12pts (4th) - 2nd in Final
 2006 - Sidewinders Speedway - 5th - 9pts
 2007 - Gold Coast Speedway - 2nd - 12pts (3rd) - 2nd in Final

Queensland Under-21 Championship
 2009 - North Brisbane Speedway - Winner

New South Wales Championship
 2010 - Oakburn Park Speedway - Winner

Great Britain
Premier League (Britain)
 2009 - Winner for King's Lynn Stars

Premier League Knockout Cup
 2009 - Winner for King's Lynn Stars

Premier Trophy
 2009 - Winner for King's Lynn Stars

Elite League (Britain)
 2010 - 2nd for Poole Pirates
 2011 - Winner for Poole Pirates
 2012 - 2nd for Poole Pirates
 2013 - Winner for Poole Pirates
 2014 - Winner for Poole Pirates

Poland
Team Polish Championship (Speedway Ekstraliga)
 2009 - 2nd for Unibax Toruń (Average 1.396 in 53 heats)
 2010 - 3rd for Unibax Toruń (Average 0.981 in 53 heats)
 2012 - 3rd for Unibax Toruń (Average 1.989 in 91 heats)
 2013 - 2nd for Unibax Toruń (Average 2.041 in 74 heats)

See also
 Australia national speedway team
 Australian Under-21 Team

References

Australian speedway riders
1992 births
Living people
Racing drivers from Queensland